Munella is a mountain peak in Shkodër, Lezhë Albania.

See also   
 Geography of Albania
 Mountains of Albania

References 

 

Mountains of Albania
Geography of Shkodër County
Geography of Lezhë County